Gary Kelly (born 23 June 1962) is an American politician.

Kelly was born on 23 June 1962 in Cameron, Missouri, and raised on a farm near Kidder. He graduated from Hamilton's Penney High School in 1980 and studied broadcasting and film at Central Missouri State University, and later attended Asbury Theological Seminary.

Prior to pursuing political office, Kelly was a police officer.

Kelly was first elected to the Missouri House of Representatives in 2000, defeating District 36 incumbent Rodger Fitzwater in a Democratic Party primary, then winning the general election uncontested. Kelly was unopposed during the 2002 general election, after facing Excelsior Springs mayor pro-term Benny Ward in a primary election. Kelly won his third primary contest in 2004, against Jerry McCarter, then subsequently lost the general election to Bob Nance.

References

Living people
American police officers
21st-century American politicians
Democratic Party members of the Missouri House of Representatives
People from Richmond, Missouri
Asbury Theological Seminary alumni
University of Central Missouri alumni
People from Cameron, Missouri
1962 births